The 1986 Australian Touring Car Championship was the 27th running of the Australian Touring Car Championship. It began on 2 March 1986 at Amaroo Park and ended on 13 July at Oran Park Raceway after ten rounds. This was the second ATCC to be run to the FIA's international Group A Touring Car Regulations.

Season Summary
The championship was won by Auckland (New Zealand) resident Robbie Francevic driving a Volvo Dealer Team Volvo 240T, the first time the championship had been won by a non-Australian resident and the first ATCC won by a turbocharged car. Francevic, who won Rounds 1, 2 and 4, defeated George Fury driving a Nissan Skyline DR30 RS who won Rounds 3, 5, 7, 8 and 10 of the series. Francevic's wins in the opening two rounds at Amaroo Park and Symmons Plains were when the Volvo team was still run by MPM, Mark Petch Motorsport. Following Francevic's Amaroo win, Petch and Bob Atkins, head of the Australian Volvo Dealer Council, announced the formation of the AVDT, Australian Volvo Dealer Team, and hired former HDT team manager John Sheppard to run the team on a day-to-day basis from Sheppard's Calder work shop. Contrary to what has been written in the past, Petch stayed involved as "Team Principle" until 10 July 1986, when he resigned over a disagreement with how Sheppard was managing the Team. The AVDT purchased MPM original 240T GpA car, and spares, which included a spare 240 GT body shell, which later became the basis for a new Australian built car, with all new parts and technical assistance from VMS. Francevic's 1985 endurance co-driver and dual Australian Drivers' Champion John Bowe joining the team full-time for his first ATCC campaign, in the team's new second car, a RHD car ex RAS in Belgium, which arrived just in time for the 4th round of the ATCC at Adelaide International Raceway, where Bowe qualified on pole, and led the race before engine issues forced his retirement. Bowe repeated his first Championship Pole position performance at the 5th round of the Champion at Barbagallo Raceway, only to have to retire again from a substantial lead with more engine issues. Peter Brock won round 6 at Surfers Paradise in his new for 1986 Holden VK Commodore SS Group A (his last ATCC win until 1989 and the last race win by a Holden Commodore until his win in Round 1, Heat 1 of the 1992 ATCC) while defending champion Jim Richards could only manage one win in his JPS Team BMW 635 CSi, winning Round 9 at Winton. Richards had finished the race in second place behind Nissan team driver Gary Scott, but the Nissan was later disqualified for having oversize brakes. Although the paperwork for the Nissan's new brakes had been put through, they had not yet been homologated which led to Scott's DQ.

Series regular Allan Grice missed the 1986 ATCC (he had also missed the 1985 championship) as he was racing his Les Small prepared Group A Commodore in the 1986 FIA Touring Car Championship (ETCC). Peter Brock missed some early rounds due to also racing his Commodore in Europe.

With the ATCC consisting of 10 rounds, many of the top level teams including the Holden Dealer Team, Dick Johnson Racing, JPS Team BMW and the Peter Jackson Nissan team all made loud noises during the year about the lack of prize money on offer for their efforts as the top drawing motorsport category in the country, especially as Group A racing had proven far more expensive than the old Group C regulations (Peter Brock estimated that his Bathurst winning Group C Commodore of 1984 had cost around AU$36,000 to build while his 1986 Group A Commodore had cost around $200,000, a cost increase of around 550%), with teams and drivers often racing for as little as $1,500 for a round win. Part of the problem for the teams was that due to Australia's size and the vast distance between the major cities where the race tracks were located, the prize money on offer usually did not even cover their transportation costs, let alone the cost of building, maintaining and racing the cars. Pressure was being put on the Confederation of Australian Motor Sport (CAMS) to come up with a series sponsor for future championships or they would risk smaller and smaller grids. CAMS rectified this from 1987 by signing a multi-year sponsorship deal with Shell who would provide some $275,000 in prize money.

Teams and drivers
The following drivers and teams competed in the 1986 Australian Touring Car Championship.

Results and standings

Race calendar
The championship was contested over ten rounds with one race per round.

Drivers Championship
Points were awarded 25-23-20-17-15-13-11-10-9-8-7-6-4-3-2-1 based on the top 17 outright race positions. The two smaller engine capacity classes received bonus points. Class B, under 3.0 litres received 3 points additional to points scored from race position. Class C, under 2.0 litres received 4 points.

Class A consisted of BMW 635 CSi, Ford Mustang GT, Ford Sierra XR4Ti, Holden VK Commodore SS Group A, Jaguar XJS, Rover Vitesse.

Class B consisted of Alfa Romeo GTV6, BMW 323i, BMW 325i, Mazda RX-7, Mitsubishi Starion Turbo, Nissan Skyline DR30 RS, Toyota Supra and Volvo 240T.

Class C consisted of Holden Gemini, Nissan Gazelle, Toyota Celica and Toyota Corolla.

See also
1986 Australian Touring Car season

References

External links
 Official V8 Supercar site Contains historical ATCC information.

Australian Touring Car Championship seasons
Touring Cars